The Charter School of Wilmington (CSW) is a college preparatory charter high school in Wilmington, Delaware. It is Delaware's first independently operated public school whose curriculum emphasizes math and science. It shares the former Wilmington High School building with Cab Calloway School of the Arts.

History
The Charter School of Wilmington was chartered by the Red Clay Consolidated School District to replace the Academy of Mathematics and Science magnet school and opened in 1996. Today, the school is operated by a consortium of six companies: AstraZeneca, Verizon, Delmarva Power, DuPont, Hercules Incorporated, and Christiana Care Health System. It is a member of the National Consortium of Secondary STEM Schools, a group of around 100 high schools, as well as affiliates such as colleges and universities, summer programs, foundations, and corporations.

Academics

In 2021,U.S. News & World Report ranked it #74 of nearly 18,000 high schools considered and Newsweek ranked it #94 of STEM schools nationwide. In 2013, CSW was given a Recognition School award from the Delaware Department of Education for exceptional performance and in 2013 and 2019, the US Department of Education named them a National Blue Ribbon School. In June 2014, CSW's Jefferson Awards Council was given the Outstanding Service for Jefferson Council Volunteer award.

Students also have the option of taking classes such as visual arts, drama, and music at Cab Calloway School of the Arts, who they share a building with. They also have the opportunity to dual enroll at the University of Delaware. During their junior year, students must complete a research project for the science fair. Sophomores take Introduction to Scientific Research to prepare for this annual event.

Students

Demographics
In 2020 White students make large proportions of the student body and about 30% of the students were Asian American. Fewer than 8% of the student bodies combined from this school and Cab Calloway School of the Arts reside in the City of Wilmington, and fewer than 3% are Wilmington residents who are black and/or Hispanic/Latino or multiracial. Barrish and Eichmann wrote that an Asian American suburban student living in an "affluent" area "is a fairly typical Charter of Wilmington student."

Extra-curriculars
Students have the option of joining concert band and marching band, of which are associated with Cab Calloway School of the Arts.

The Force File
The school's newspaper, The Force File, is a digital-first newspaper owned and operated by CSW students.

Media appearances
The Charter School of Wilmington's founder, Ronald Russo, has been featured on TruTV's The Principal's Office.

Notable alumni

Andrew Gemmell, swimmer in the 2012 Summer Olympics
Kieran Tuntivate, 2019 Southeast Asian Games record-holding distance runner who qualified for the 2020 Summer Olympics, rescheduled for 2021
Madinah Wilson-Anton, politician in the Delaware House of Representatives

Notable faculty and staff
Chris Eddy (Athletic Director, 2009—present), former MLB pitcher

References

External links 
 
The Force File

Educational institutions established in 1996
High schools in New Castle County, Delaware
NCSSS schools
Charter schools in Delaware
Public high schools in Delaware
1996 establishments in Delaware
Wilmington, Delaware